Selu: Seeking the Corn-Mother's Wisdom is a book by Marilou Awiakta.  It uses poems, essays, and drawings to explore themes of unity and diversity.  Awiakta uses the Cherokee story of corn as a "compass-story" to keep readers oriented throughout her lessons.

The book draws on Cherokee storytelling traditions, the Appalachian landscape, and observations of contemporary society to provide "tribal-specific, decolonizing lessons".  She also uses the book to explore connections between her Celtic, Scots-Irish, and Cherokee heritage.

Basketweaving

Awiakta draws on Cherokee basket double-weaving traditions throughout the book. "Awiakta weaves together multiple genres, time periods, and voices to mimic the process of traditional basketweaving in her book's structure."

Adaptations

Selu was later adapted into a Grammy-nominated audio recording.

References

Books about Appalachia
Literature by Native American women
American poetry collections
1994 non-fiction books
Cherokee culture